The Guadalcanal boobook (Ninox granti), also known as the Guadalcanal owl is a small to medium-sized owl.  It is endemic to Guadalcanal.  It was formerly considered a subspecies of the Solomons boobook.

References

Guadalcanal owl
Endemic birds of the Solomon Islands
Owls of Oceania
Least concern biota of Oceania
Guadalcanal owl
Taxa named by Richard Bowdler Sharpe